The Georgian–Ossetian conflict of 1918–1920 were a series of uprisings, which took place in the Ossetian-inhabited areas of what is now South Ossetia, a breakaway republic in Georgia, against the Transcaucasian Democratic Federative Republic and then the Menshevik-dominated Democratic Republic of Georgia which claimed several thousand lives and left painful memories among the Georgian and Ossetian communities of the region.

During its brief tenure, the Menshevik government of Georgia came across significant problems with ethnic Ossetians who largely sympathized with the Bolsheviks and Soviet Russia. The reasons behind the conflict were complicated. An overdue land reform and agrarian disturbances in the poor Ossetian-populated areas intermingled with an ethnic discord and the struggle for power in the Caucasus.

1917–1918
After the 1917 February Revolution that resulted in the abdication of Tsar Nicholas II of Russia, the Ossetians set up a National Council of Ossetians which convened in Java in June 1917 and advocated the creation of organs of self-rule in Ossetian-inhabited areas on both sides of the Caucasus. The Council was internally divided along the ideological lines and soon became dominated by the Bolsheviks who called for the unification of North and South Ossetias and the incorporation of South Ossetia into Soviet Russia.

Already in February 1918, there were numerous outbreaks of disobedience among the Ossetian peasants who refused to pay taxes to the Tiflis-based Transcaucasian government. On 15 March 1918, the Ossetian peasants rose in rebellion and managed to hold off an offensive by a Georgian People's Guard punitive detachment commanded by an ethnic Ossetian officer, Kosta Kaziev. The fighting culminated in the town of Tskhinvali which was occupied by the rebels on 19 March 1918. The Georgian People's Guard regained the control of Tskhinvali on 22 March. The uprising was finally suppressed and harsh repressive measures established in the region, generating resentment against the Mensheviks, being now equated, in the eyes of the Ossetians, with Georgians. This also opened the way for strong pro-Bolshevik sentiments among the Ossetians.

Valiko Jugheli spoke about the Ossetians saying, "Our worst and most relentless enemies" and, "These traitors should be cruelly punished. There is no other way."

1919
In October 1919, revolts against the Mensheviks broke out again in several areas. On 23 October, rebels in the Roki area proclaimed the establishment of Soviet power and began advancing toward Tskhinvali, but suffered defeat and retreated to the Soviet-controlled Terek district.

The year 1919 also saw a series of fruitless discussions concerning the status and governance of the region. Ossetians demanded a degree of autonomy comparable with the one granted to the Abkhazians and Muslim Georgians in Adjara. However, no final decision was made, and the Georgian government outlawed the National Council of South Ossetia, a Bolshevik-dominated body, and refused any grant of autonomy. Bolsheviks fully exploited the tensions and the Menshevik mistakes to further strengthen their influence among the Ossetians.

1920
In 1920, a much larger Ossetian uprising took place, which was supported by the regional committee of the Bolshevik Russian Communist Party, which had gathered a military force in Vladikavkaz, the capital of modern-day North Ossetia-Alania, Russia. Despite assurance of respecting Georgia's territorial integrity in the Treaty of Moscow of 7 May 1920, Soviet Russia demanded Georgia recall its troops from Ossetia.

Many villages were burned down large areas were depopulated, around 5,000 people perished and 20,000 Ossetians were forced to seek refuge in Soviet Russia. Ossetian sources give the following breakdown of casualties: 387 men, 172 women, and 110 children were killed in action or massacred; 1,206 men, 1,203 women, and 1,732 children died during flight. The total fatalities amounted to 4,812–5,279 according to another source, i.e., 6–8 percent of the region's total Ossetian population.

In the spring and summer of 1920, Georgia crushed the revolt.

Aftermath
In February 1921, many Ossetians joined the advancing Red Army which brought Georgia's independence to an end. In April 1922, newly established Soviet Georgian government rewarded the Ossetian service with the establishment of the South Ossetian Autonomous Oblast which included not only Ossetian and mixed Georgian-Ossetian, but also purely Georgian villages and had Tskhinvali, where the Ossetians were in minority at that time, as its capital.

Assessment
Despite the bloody conflict and painful memories left by it, the relations between Georgians and Ossetians remained peaceful throughout the Soviet period in contrast to Georgia's other ethnic troublespot, Abkhazia, where ethnic discord was much more profound and potentially inflammable.

With the rising of ethnic tensions in South Ossetia in the late 1980s, the 1918–1920 thematic surfaced again, with conflicting narratives and interpretations of the conflict. The South Ossetians consider those events as part of their struggle for self-determination and claim that the Georgian reaction to the uprisings was genocide. The depopulated Ossetian villages were allegedly occupied by their Georgian neighbors from the Dusheti and K'azbegi districts. On 2 November 2006, the People's Assembly of Abkhazia unanimously passed a resolution recognizing the Georgian actions of 1918–1920 and 1989–1992 as a genocide under the 1948 convention. 

Georgia deny the accusations and consider the figures exaggerated. While not denying the brutality of the fighting, they view the conflict as the first attempt by Russia to destabilise Georgia by encouraging South Ossetia to secede and explain the severity of Georgian reaction by the Ossetian pillage of Tskhinvali and the Bolsheviks’ role in the events.

Notes

References

Bibliography

 
 

History of South Ossetia
Wars involving Georgia (country)
Wars involving Russia
Georgian–Ossetian conflict
Russian Civil War
Conflicts in 1918
Conflicts in 1919
Conflicts in 1920